The 150th Idritsa-Berlin Order of Kutuzov 2nd Class Motor Rifle Division of the Russian Ground Forces is a tank and artillery division that was re-instituted in 2016. It is part of the 8th Guards Army, which was reformed in 2017, in the Southern Military District.

Its Red Army predecessor fought on the Eastern Front of World War II from 1941 to 1945. It gained fame for being the formation whose soldiers raised the Soviet flag over the Reichstag shortly before the end of the war. The nickname ‘Idritskaya’ was given to the Soviet division on July 23, 1944, by the order № 207 for its heroic battle in the town of Idritsa. The division fought at Schneidemühl and Berlin.

History
The division was formed three times, being initially established at Vyazma in September 1939. As part of the 3rd Army's 3rd Rifle Corps, the division took part in the Soviet Invasion of Poland.

Force Composition

 469th Rifle Regiment
 674th Rifle Regiment
 756th Rifle Regiment
 328th Light Artillery Regiment
 418th Howitzer Regiment

Operating as part of the 9th Army on 22 June 1941, then, after the Second Battle of Kharkov, was wiped out at Izyum in May 1942.

2nd Formation
The division was reformed at Turga in the Siberian Military District on July 23, 1942, based on the 1st Siberian Volunteer Division. The unit was made up of over 10,000 men from Siberian factories and the Kuzbass coal fields and had a cadre of 1,460 combat veterans. By September 1 it had enlisted 13,754 personnel, 43.8 percent of whom were Communist Party members or Komsomols. Within two weeks it was assigned to the 6th "Siberian Volunteer" Rifle Corps and began moving by rail to camps near Moscow where it received the last of its support troops and transport. On September 30, the 150th set out on a 170km road march to join the 22nd Army near Belyi, part of the Kalinin Front.

During the Second Rzhev-Sychevka Offensive (Operation Mars) the 150th Division and the 6th Rifle Corps were referred to as "Stalin" units and were regarded as an elite force. On January 6, 1943, the division was pulled from the line and moved by rail to the Velikiye Luki area, where it served in the 5th Guards Rifle Corps during the last few days of the battle for that city, then on the 25th staged an assault crossing of the Lovat and Loknya Rivers. By the middle of February it was back in 6th Corps in 22nd Army. Over the next two months it fought in the Kholm area, pinning down the German forces evacuating from the Demyansk Pocket. On April 16 the Supreme High Command recognized the service of the 6th "Siberian Volunteer" Rifle Corps by re-designating it as the 19th Guards Rifle Corps, and three days later the 150th became the second formation of the 22nd Guards Rifle Division.

3rd Formation

It was then re-created for the third time in September 1943. When formed for the third time, it was composed of the 127th, 144th, and 151st brigades. Initially, this division fell under the command of the 34th Army. But during some time in early 1944, it was transferred to the 6th Guards Army, and then finally it was assigned to the 79th Rifle Corps of the 3rd Shock Army, of the 1st Belorussian Front, under which it would stay on the offensive all the way from Nevel, Pskov Oblast to Berlin.

On April 22, 1945, when victory for the Soviet Army was near, an order from the Military Council of the 3rd Shock Army designated the 150th Division to be one of 9 divisions to receive a special banner solely for the purpose of raising it over the Reichstag as a sign of the Soviet victory. Red Army photographer Yevgeny Khaldei took the picture of soldiers Kovaliev and another comrade of the Division's 756th Rifle Regiment hoisting the flag (called the Victory Banner) on April 30, 1945, on the roof of the Reichstag building. An earlier flag had been raised the day before while the building was being fought over with remaining German soldiers. However, as the flag was raised after dusk, there was no chance to take a picture. After taking the shot with the flag Khaldei rushed back to Moscow, and it was later decided that the true persons on the photo, Kovaliev and his comrade, were not politically correct. So they became Meliton Kantaria (a Georgian, like Stalin) and Mikhail Yegorov (a Russian).

On April 26, 1945, for its earlier heroic overnight victory at lake Woświn east of Stargard,  150th Rifle Division was awarded the Order of Kutuzov, second degree.

In December 1946 the division was disbanded in the Group of Soviet Forces in Germany.

15 personnel were awarded the Gold Star Medal as Heroes of the Soviet Union, while a veteran of the unit was given the Gold Star Medal as a Hero of Ukraine in 2005.

Reactivation (2016)

The unit was re-established in December 2016 in Rostov Oblast as a full motor rifle division with its division HQ scheduled to open in Novocherkassk and was meant to become part of the to-be-reactivated 8th Guards Army, as part of the broader structural reform of the Russian armed forces.

The division was equipped with T-90A MBTs, BMP-3 IFVs and BTR-80 APCs, and contains as-yet undisclosed infantry, armour, artillery and SAM regiments, as well as communications, logistics and intelligence units. The division's re-formation was completed by 2017. In 2018, Russian president Putin signed decrees naming some of the division's units after localities in Belarus, Poland, and Ukraine.

On the eve of Victory Day in 2019, the commander of the Southern Military District, Colonel General Aleksandr Dvornikov, presented a copy of the Victory Banner to the commander of the 150th Rifle Division.

The division has been heavily engaged in the invasion of Ukraine with its commander, Major General Oleg Mityaev, reportedly killed in action around March 18.

Organization as of 2017/18

 Division HQ
 174th Reconnaissance Battalion
 258th Signal Battalion
 293rd Materiel Battalion
 539th Engineers Battalion
 Anti-Tank Artillery Battalion
 Medical Battalion
 Electronic Warfare Company
 UAV Company
 NBC protection company
 102nd Slonim-Pomeranian Motorized Rifle Regiment
 103rd Motorized Rifle Regiment
 68th Guards Zhytomyr-Berlin Tank Regiment
 163rd Guards Nizhyn Tank Regiment
 381st Guards Warsaw Artillery Regiment
 993rd Upper Dnipro Anti-Aircraft Missile Regiment
 Additional Motorized Rifle Regiment reported forming in 2018

Commanders

Major-general Sergei Alekseyevich Kniazkov (1939–1940)
Major-general Alexander Ivanovich Pastrevich (1940–1941)
Major-general Daniil Grigorevich Egorov (1941–1942)
Colonel Leonid Vasilyevich Yakovlev (September 1943 – April 1944)
Major-general Vasily Mitrofanovich Shatilov (May 1944 – December 1946)
Major-general Pyotr Nikolayevich Bolgarev (2016–2018)
Major-general Ruslan Musaevich Dzeitov (2018–2019)
Major-general Vladimir Khazretovich Elkanov (2019–2020)
Major-general Oleg Yurevich Mitiaev (2020–), reported by Ukrainian sources as killed during the Siege of Mariupol in the 2022 Russian invasion of Ukraine)

See also
List of Soviet Union divisions 1917–1945
Victory Banner

References

Sources
Шатилов В.М. Знамя над рейхстагом. 3-е изд. М.: Воениздат, 1975;
Наша газета
http://samsv.narod.ru/Div/Sd/sd150/default.html
https://informnapalm.org/en/myths-and-reality-behind-the-150th-division-russian-state-of-art-21st-century-armed-forces/

Infantry divisions of the Soviet Union in World War II
Military units and formations established in 1939
Military units and formations disestablished in 1946
Military units and formations established in 2016